Dadkan (also Romanized as Dādkān; also known as Dad Gan, Dādkān-e Soflá, and Dād Khān) is a village in Irandegan Rural District, Irandegan District, Khash County, Sistan and Baluchestan Province, Iran. At the 2006 census, its population was 800, in 171 families.

References 

Populated places in Khash County